Vaibhav() is a male given name in the Sanskrit language.

People

Vaibhav Deshpande (born 1987), Indian cricketer 
Vaibhav Kaul (born 1991), Indian photographer
Vaibhav Madhukar Pichad (born 1974), Indian politician
Vaibhav Mangle (born 1975), Indian actor
Vaibhav Naik (born 1982), Indian politician
Vaibhav Rawal (born 1991), Indian cricketer
Vaibhav Reddy (born 1980), Indian actor
Vaibhav Talwar (born 1974), Indian actor
Vaibbhav Tatwawdi (born 1988), Indian actor
Vaibhav Wategaonkar (born 1982), Indian cricketer

References

Indian given names
Hindu given names